"Trip" is a pop punk song recorded by Canadian band Hedley. It was released on October 4, 2005 as the third single from their debut album Hedley (2005). The single topped the Canadian MuchMusic Countdown and reached number eleven on the Canadian Singles Chart. It sold close to 3,000 copies. "Trip" appears on the US version of Famous Last Words, which is called Never Too Late.

Music video
The music video for "Trip" was released in 2005. The video was directed by Jack Richardson and Kyle Davidson.

Commercial performance 
"Trip" is the second Hedley single to reach the Canadian Singles Chart as it peaked at number 11. It also reached the Canada CHR/Pop Top 30 at number 14 and number 9 on the Canada Hot AC Top 30. The song reached number 1 on Canada's MuchMusic Countdown on the week of February 17, 2006.

Awards and nominations

Track listing

Personnel
Credits for "Trip" adapted from AllMusic.

Hedley
 Jacob Hoggard – lead vocals
 Dave Rosin – guitar
 Tommy Mac – bass guitar
 Chris Crippin - drums

Additional musicians
 Brian Howes - keyboards
 Jay Van Poederooyen - percussion

Production
 Mike Fraser – engineer, mixing, producer
 Brian Howes – producer
 George Marino - mastering engineer
 Misha Rajaratnam - assistant engineer

Charts

References

2005 songs
Hedley (band) songs
Songs written by Jacob Hoggard
Universal Music Canada singles